Ploaghe is a comune (municipality) in the Province of Sassari in the Italian region Sardinia, located about  north of Cagliari and about  southeast of Sassari. 

Ploaghe borders the following municipalities: Ardara, Chiaramonti, Codrongianos, Nulvi, Osilo, Siligo.

People
Giovanni Spano (1803-1878), scholar of archaeology, linguist, and politician.

References

Cities and towns in Sardinia